Pavlovskoye is a rural locality (a village) in Vysokovskoye Rural Settlement, Ust-Kubinsky District, Vologda Oblast, Russia. The population was 15 as of 2002.

Geography 
The distance to Ustye is 27 km, to Vysokoye is 17 km. Novoye is the nearest rural locality.

References 

Rural localities in Ust-Kubinsky District